Jack Sullivan may refer to:
Jack Sullivan (baseball) (1873–1924), American baseball catcher
Jack Sullivan (basketball) (1935–2010), American basketball coach
Jack Sullivan (executive), English football executive
Jack Sullivan (film director) (1893–1946), assistant film director
Jack Sullivan (footballer, born 1879) (1879–1957), Australian rules footballer for Essendon
Jack Sullivan (footballer, born 1919) (1919–1990), Australian rules footballer for Richmond
Jack Sullivan (Irish footballer), Ireland international footballer
Jack Sullivan (journalist) (1913–1992), Canadian journalist and writer
Jack Sullivan (literary scholar) (born 1946), American literary scholar, essayist and writer
Jack Sullivan (lacrosse) (1870–?), Canadian lacrosse player
Jack Sullivan (rugby union) (1915–1990), New Zealand rugby union player and coach
Jack Sullivan Jr. (1933–2002), Australian rules footballer for Carlton

See also
John Sullivan (disambiguation)
Jackie Sullivan (1918–1992), baseball player
Jacquie O'Sullivan (born 1960), British singer